The Guam national football team represents Guam, overseas territory of the United States in international football and is controlled by the Guam Football Association. They are affiliated with the Asian Football Confederation's East Asian Football Federation region.

Guam reached its highest ever position in the FIFA World Ranking at 146 in 2015 after victories over Turkmenistan and India.

History

Beginnings

Football in Guam began in the 1960s, on the initiative of two pioneers: an Irish priest, Tony Gillespie, and an owner of a construction company, Charles Whang, who settled in Guam and created the Guam Soccer Cup before becoming the first president of the Guam Football Association in 1975.

Guam played its first international match at the 1975 Pacific Games against Solomon Islands, losing 5–1. This result was followed by an 11–0 loss to Fiji, eliminating them from the competition. In the 1979 Games, Guam again lost twice to New Caledonia 11–1 and New Hebrides 5–0. Progressing to the Consolation Tournament, Guam registered their first victories, beating Western Samoa 4–2, and Tuvalu 7–2 before losing again to New Hebrides, 5–1.

Despite being considered part of Oceania, and having never faced an Asian team to that point, Guam became an associate member of the AFC in 1991 but continued to participate in the Pacific Games. In 1996, Guam became both a full member of the AFC and of FIFA.

1996-2011
A full member of the AFC and FIFA, Guam played its first matches against Asian teams as part of the 1996 Asian Cup of Nations qualifiers losing all three matches against South Korea (9–0), Vietnam (9–0) and Chinese Taipei (9–2).

In 1998, Guam played in the Micronesian Games, though the tournament was a 9-a-side competition with 80 minute matches. Guam finished top of the group stage but lost to Northern Marianas in the final 3–0. Guam entered the 2000 Asian Cup qualification but finished last in their group again, losing to China 19–0.

Guam became one of the founding members of the East Asian Football Federation in 2002 and participated in the qualifiers for the inaugural 2003 East Asian Football Championship, finishing last again without registering a goal. The same is true for the 2004 AFC Asian Cup qualification, beaten by Bhutan and Mongolia. For the 2006 World Cup qualifiers, Guam entered and were scheduled to face Nepal in the first round but both Nepal and Guam withdrew for financial reasons before their first match.

In the 2005 East Asian Football Championship qualifiers, Guam lost all four matches heavily, against Chinese Taipei (9–0), Hong Kong (15–0), Mongolia (4–1) and North Korea (21–0). Following these defeats, Guam entered the 2006 AFC Challenge Cup, a competition designed for emerging nations to help develop their football. Guam again lost all three matches to Palestine (11–0), Bangladesh (3–0) and Cambodia (3–0).

Guam advanced to the second stage of qualifying in the 2008 East Asian Football Championship by beating Northern Marianas 12–2 over two legs but they were eliminated in the next round by Chinese Taipei (10–0) and Hong Kong (15–1). In the 2010 East Asian Football Championship qualifiers, Guam managed to get its first victory over a FIFA member, beating Mongolia 1–0. They would go on to top the group before being eliminated at the next stage. Guam returned to the 2011 Pacific Games after a sixteen-year absence, but only managed to beat American Samoa 2–0, finishing second last and failing to advance to the knock-out stages.

2012-present

Gary White became Guam's manager in 2012 and called-up players of Guamanian origin based in the United States like Ryan Guy or A. J. DeLaGarza to improve the level of his team. In the 2013 EAFF East Asian Cup, Matao managed to advance past the first round by beating Northern Marianas (3–1) and Macao (3–0). Guam then participated in the 2012 Philippine Peace Cup, replacing Hong Kong, losing against Philippines (1–0) and Chinese Taipei (2–0) but beat Macao (3–0) in its final group game to finish third. Guam advanced to the second qualifying stage of both the 2015 and 2017 EAFF Championship finishing third and fourth respectively and failing to advance the final competition.

In 2018 FIFA World Cup qualification, Guam beat Turkmenistan (1–0) and India (2–1), finishing fourth in their group and qualifying for the 2019 Asian Cup third round qualifiers, although Guam withdrew before the draw took place. Guam then failed to progress past the first qualifying round for the 2019 EAFF Championship.

During the 2022 World Cup qualifiers, Guam beat Bhutan 5–1 over two legs but lost all eight of their second round matches and finished bottom of their group, scoring two goals and conceding 32.

Nickname

Until 2011, the nickname of the Guamanian selection was Chamorros, in reference to the local population of Guam. When Gary White took charge of Guam, the team has changed their nickname to Matao, meaning "courage" in the Chamorro language. Matao also refers to Matua, the greatest leader in ancient Chamorro society. White also promoted the use of a ritual song before each match of the selection, the Inifresi.

Results and fixtures

2022

Current coaching staff

Coaching history

 Willie McFaul (1999–2003)
 Sugao Kambe (2003–2005)
 Norio Tsukitate (2005–2009)
 Kazuo Uchida (2011–2012)
 Gary White (2012–2016)
 Darren Sawatzky (2016–2017)
 Karl Dodd (2017–2021)
 Seo Dong-won (2021)
 Kim Sang-hoon (2021–present)

Players

Current squad
The following 22 players were called up for 2023 AFC Asian Cup qualification matches against Cambodia on 9 and 12 October 2021 respectively.

Caps and goals correct as of 13 June 2021, after the match against Philippines.

Recent call-ups
The following players have also been called up to the Guam squad within last 12 months.

RET

INJ Withdrew due to injury
PRE Preliminary squad
RET Retired from the national team
SUS Serving suspension

Player records

Players in bold are still active with Guam.

Competitive record

FIFA World Cup

AFC Asian Cup 

 2019 – Withdrew from the third tournament due to financial constraints.

East Asian Football Championship

AFC Challenge Cup
2006 – Round 1
2008 – 4th in qualifying group

Pacific Games

Pacific Mini Games

Micronesian Games

1998 – Winners (According to AFC profile)

Mariana Cup
2007, 2008, 2010

References

External links

 

 
Asian national association football teams
Football in Guam
1975 establishments in Guam